Sara Carruthers is a member of the Ohio House of Representatives, representing the 47th district since 2019.  A Republican, Carruthers represents portions of southern Butler County. Prior to elected office, Carruthers worked in the media industry, including for WKRC-TV in Cincinnati.  She also worked as a press assistant for Ronald Reagan and George H. W. Bush.

Education 
Carruthers attended Miami University. Carruthers is a member of the Delta Zeta sorority.

Career 
In 2018, Carruthers successfully ran in the Republican primary against state Representative Wes Retherford, who had been arrested for drunk driving. She easily won the general election.

In 2019, it was found that Carruthers was sued for an alleged fraud case surrounding when she adopted twins more than a decade ago but failed to live up to a promise that she would provide a home for the birth mother and her three children.  Despite an audio recording of Carruthers admitting to the allegations, she claimed it was an extortion attempt.

Electoral History

References

External links 
 Representative Sara P. Carruthers at ohiohouse.gov
 Sara Carruthers at votesmart.org

Living people
Republican Party members of the Ohio House of Representatives
21st-century American politicians
Year of birth missing (living people)
Miami University alumni
Women state legislators in Ohio
21st-century American women politicians